Thomas Phinn, QC ( – 31 October 1866) was a British barrister and Liberal Party politician.
He held various positions in the Admiralty of the United Kingdom in the mid-19th century.

Life 
Born in Bath, Somerset, Phinn was educated at Eton College and Exeter College, Oxford. He read for the bar at the Inner Temple, being called in 1840.
He was elected at the 1852 general election as Member of Parliament for Bath, but held that seat for only three years, until 1855.

He was appointed Counsel to the Admiralty and Judge Advocate of the Fleet on 17  April 1854,
and continued in that office until appointed Second Secretary to the Admiralty on 22  May 1855, He was made a Queen's Counsel in 1857.
a post which required his resignation from the House of Commons. He resigned from the Admiralty on 7  May 1857, but was re-appointed Counsel and Judge-Advocate on 12  November 1863, and held that post until his death on 31  October 1866, in London.

References

Footnotes

Bibliography 

 C. I. Hamilton, ed., "Selections from the Phinn Committee of Inquiry of October–November 1853 into the State of the Office of Secretary to the Admiralty", in The Naval Miscellany, volume V, edited by N. A. M. Rodger, (London: Navy Records Society, London, 1984).

External links 
 

1814 births
1866 deaths
Alumni of Exeter College, Oxford
Liberal Party (UK) MPs for English constituencies
Members of the Inner Temple
People educated at Eton College
People from Bath, Somerset
Permanent Secretaries to the Admiralty
Politics of Bath, Somerset
UK MPs 1852–1857
English King's Counsel
English barristers